John Black (born 10 November 1957) is a Scottish former professional footballer who played as a winger. Black played in the English Football League for Wolverhampton Wanderers, Bradford City, and Hereford United, before playing non-league football with Scarborough.

He was born in 1957 in Helensburgh, Scotland.

References

External links

1957 births
Living people
Scottish footballers
Wolverhampton Wanderers F.C. players
Bradford City A.F.C. players
Hereford United F.C. players
Scarborough F.C. players
English Football League players
Association football wingers